Metropolis is an album by Peter Cincotti, released in May 2012. It is Cincotti's fourth album.

Track list

 Metropolis - 4:25
 My Religion - 3:48
 Do Or Die - 3:48
 Take A Good Look - 4:16
 Nothing's Enough - 3:44
 Magnetic - 4:07
 Graffiti Wall - 3:40
 Fit You Better - 3:21
 Madeline - 4:01
 World Gone Crazy - 3:23
 Forever And Always - 4:12
 Before I Go - 3:35

References

2012 albums
Peter Cincotti albums